Jan-Ingwer Callsen-Bracker (born 23 September 1984) is a German former professional footballer who played as a centre-back.

Career
Callsen-Bracker joined TSV Bollingstedt and SV Beuel 06 before joining Bayer Leverkusen in 1998.

In 2011, Callsen-Bracker signed with FC Augsburg. In June 2017, he agreed to a one-year contract extension until 2018.

Career statistics

1.Includes DFB-Pokal.
2.Includes UEFA Champions League and UEFA Europa League.
3.Includes DFB-Ligapokal.

References

External links
 Leverkusen who's who
 
 

1984 births
Living people
People from Schleswig, Schleswig-Holstein
German footballers
Germany under-21 international footballers
Bundesliga players
2. Bundesliga players
Regionalliga players
Bayer 04 Leverkusen players
Bayer 04 Leverkusen II players
Borussia Mönchengladbach players
Borussia Mönchengladbach II players
FC Augsburg players
FC Augsburg II players
1. FC Kaiserslautern players
Association football defenders
Footballers from Schleswig-Holstein